Union Sportive Médinat d'Annaba, known as USM Annaba or simply USMAN for short, is an Algerian football club based in Annaba. It was founded in 1983 and its colours are red and white. Their home stadium, 19 May Stadium has a capacity of 55,000 spectators. The club is currently playing in Algerian Ligue 2.

On April 13, 2018,  USM Annaba promoted to the Algerian Ligue Professionnelle 2 after winning 2017–18 Ligue Nationale du Football Amateur "Group East".

Honours

Domestic competitions
 Algerian Ligue Professionnelle 2
Champion (1): 2006–07

Current squad

Rival Clubs
  Hamra Annaba (Derby)
  ES Guelma (Rivalry)
  US Tebessa (Rivalry)

References

External links
Former Website

 
USM Annaba
Football clubs in Algeria
1983 establishments in Algeria
Association football clubs established in 1983
Algerian Ligue Professionnelle 1 clubs
Algerian Ligue 2 clubs